Anton Vasylyovych Savin (born 7 February 1990) is a Ukrainian professional footballer who plays as a right winger for LNZ Cherkasy.

Club career
Savin is a product of the 2 Kharkiv's Youth Sportive School Systems. He spent almost all his career as a player in different clubs of the Ukrainian First League and the Ukrainian Second League.

Alashkert
In June 2016, he signed one-year deal with Armenian club Alashkert.

LNZ Cherkasy
On 11 July 2022 he signed for LNZ Cherkasy.

References

External links
 
 

1990 births
Living people
Sportspeople from Cherkasy
Kharkiv State College of Physical Culture 1 alumni
Ukrainian footballers
Ukraine under-21 international footballers
Association football forwards
FC Hazovyk-KhGV Kharkiv players
FC Hirnyk Kryvyi Rih players
FC Metalurh Donetsk players
FC Stal Kamianske players
FC Bukovyna Chernivtsi players
FC Helios Kharkiv players
FC Kolos Zachepylivka players
FC Naftovyk-Ukrnafta Okhtyrka players
FC Hirnyk-Sport Horishni Plavni players
FC Alashkert players
PFC Sumy players
FC Poltava players
FC Polissya Zhytomyr players
FC Metalist 1925 Kharkiv players
FC LNZ Cherkasy players
Ukrainian Premier League players
Ukrainian First League players
Ukrainian Second League players
Armenian Premier League players
Ukrainian expatriate footballers
Expatriate footballers in Armenia
Ukrainian expatriate sportspeople in Armenia